Ear X-tacy is a 1994 album by instrumental rock solo artist Andy Timmons.

Track listing
"Carpe Diem" - 3:59
"Turn Away" – 4:13
"I Remember Stevie" – 5:18
"Cry For You" – 6:56
"Farmer Sez" – 1:46
"Electric Gypsy" – 4:34
"I Have No Idea" – 5:36
"This Time For Sure" – 1:52
"It's Getting Better" – 4:43
"Hiroshima (Pray For Peace)" – 6:16
"No More Goodbyes" – 5:19
"Bust A Soda" - 3:52
"There Are No Words" - 3:45

Personnel
 Andy Timmons - Guitars
 Mike Daane - Bass
 Mitch Marine - Drums

References

1994 albums
Andy Timmons albums